Plunkett is a special service area in the Canadian province of Saskatchewan within the Rural Municipality of Viscount No. 341 and Census Division No. 11. It held village status between 1921 and 2022.

History 
Plunkett incorporated as a village on December 28, 1921. It was named after Viscount Horace Plunkett, a Canadian Pacific Railway investor. It restructured on April 1, 2022, relinquishing its village status in favour of becoming a special service area under the jurisdiction of the Rural Municipality of Viscount No. 341.

Geography
Plunkett is at the intersection of Highway 16 and Highway 365. The village site is bounded by the railway to the south and Highway 16 to the north.

Demographics 

Economy 
The economy of Plunkett includes agriculture and mining, with mines located at Lanigan, Colonsay, and Allan.

See also 
 List of communities in Saskatchewan

References 

Special service areas in Saskatchewan
Division No. 11, Saskatchewan